= All-District Team =

All-District Team may refer to:

- Regional selections by United States Basketball Writers Association (USBWA) for top contributors in college basketball
- Regional selections by National Association of Basketball Coaches (NABC) for top contributors in college basketball
- Regional selections for Academic All-America honoring top college student athletes
